Sardar Muhammad Sayab Khalid Khan (born 26 March 1940) is a Pakistani politician. He was the Speaker of the Azad Kashmir Legislative Assembly from 24 July 2001 through 24 July 2006, and visited different countries lobbying for the Kashmir issue.

Early life 

He was born in Pachiot near Rawalakot, Azad Kashmir. His father, Sardar Muhammad Ayub Khan, was a civil servant in Revenue Department of Azad Kashmir who topped the departmental exam and his grandfather Sardar Kala Khan was awarded with a special honorarium of respect by Maharaja of Kashmir. His Father died when he was a toddler and his education pursuits were supervised by his eldest sister Begum Naqqi Nazir Sharif with the help of Justice S. M. Sharif Khan. He completed his law degree from the University of Peshawar

Political career 

Khalid joined the All Jammu & Kashmir Muslim Conference in 1964 when he was still a student. He was elected to be a member of the Azad Kashmir Legislative Assembly as a technocrat from 1985 to 1990 and from 1991 to 1996. In the elections of 2001, he was elected as a representative of Sudhanoti and Poonch districts, and became Speaker of the Azad Kashmir Legislative Assembly until 2006. He represented Azad Kashmir in the Organisation of Islamic Cooperation held in June 2005 in Yemen. He served 2 more terms as a representative of Sudhanoti and Poonch from 2006 to 2016. He held the portfolio of Law, Justice and Parliamentary Affairs from 2010 to 2018.

References 

1940 births
Living people
University of Peshawar alumni
People from Poonch District, Pakistan